Youyang Tujia and Miao Autonomous County, or Youyang County for short is located in southeast Chongqing Municipality, China, bordering the provinces of Hunan to the east and Guizhou to the southwest.

History 
Youyang was known as Youzhou in ancient times.

Geography 

The county contains about 1.5939 million mu of arable land, 4.46 million mu of forested land, and 2.92 million mu of grassland.

Climate

Administrative divisions 
Youyang Tujia and Miao Autonomous County is divided into 2 subdistricts, 19 towns, and 18 townships. These are then divided into 8 residential communities, and 270 administrative villages.

Subdistricts 

Towns 

Townships 

Demographics 
As of 2018, the county has a population of approximately 854,400 people. Of this, 275,000 live in urban areas, and 579,400 live in rural areas.

Vital statistics 
In 2018, the county registered a birth rate of 10.89 per thousand, a death rate of 5.74 per thousand, giving it a rate of natural increase of 5.15 per thousand.

Ethnic groups 
Youyang Tujia and Miao Autonomous County is home to 16 ethnic minorities, including the Tujia and Miao people, for which the county is named.

Culture 
The county is nicknamed the "Cradle of Tujia people" for its rich Tujia culture.

It is the home of the Baishou Dance, a symbolic tradition of Tujia people. It is a traditional dance which involves waving hands to convey stories of human origins, myths and legends, ethnic migration, ancient wars, hunting and fishing, forestry, labor, food, and other aspects of social life.

The county is also home to a number of traditional folk songs, which perhaps date back to the Southern Song Dynasty. The folk songs are popular at festivals, weddings, funerals, and other activities.

Economy 
The county has a labor force 40-50% cheaper than that of coastal areas. It is one of the counties with the most water resources in China, and has more than 20 kinds of mineral resources. Youyang is also a "Sanmu" production base, as it grows three major plants used in Chinese medicine: Eucommia ulmoides,  Magnolia officinalis, and Phellodendron amurense. The country as a whole grows about 1,200 kinds of Chinese herbal medicine materials, and is home to large amounts of Artemisia annua.

Tourism

Taohuayuan 
Taohuayuan is a 5A Tourist Attraction, the highest rank of designated attractions in China. Located in the northern corner of the county, Taohuayuan is a place at first described in The Peach Blossom Spring written by Tao Yuanming, a famous writer of the Eastern Jin Dynasty (317-420). It is notable that there are more than one Taohuayuan spots in China, and the one in Youyang is a nationwide recognised Taohuayuan.

Gongtan Ancient Town 
Gongtan Ancient Town is located at the intersection of Wu River and Apeng River, and it is a 4A Tourist Attraction. It has a history of more than 1,700 years. More than 200 courtyards and stilted building from Ming Dynasty and Qing Dynasty are preserved in Gongtan.

Wu River Gallery 

It is famous for the strangely shaped mountains along the gallery.

Longtan Ancient Town

Longtan Ancient Town is an ancient town with ancient wood architecture.

Notable people 

 Zhao Shiyan, communist revolutionary

References

External links 
Introduction of Tujia people

 
Miao autonomous counties
County-level divisions of Chongqing
Tujia autonomous counties